Anhalonidine a naturally occurring alkaloid which can be isolated from certain members of the cactus family, such as Lophophora. It is structurally related to mescaline.

See also
 Anhalamine
 Anhalidine
 Anhalinine
 Gigantine
 Pellotine

References

Lophophora
Isoquinoline alkaloids
Norsalsolinol ethers